Tornaľa (formerly Šafárikovo) is a town and municipality in Revúca District in the Banská Bystrica Region of Slovakia, with a population of approximately 7,000.

History
The first written record of the settlement dates from 1245. It was ruled by Ottoman Empire as part of Filek sanjak (Its centre was Rimaszombat) during periods of 1554-1593 and 1596–1686. It was made part of Czechoslovakia, and remained as such except for a period of Hungarian rule between 1938 and 1945 due to the Vienna Awards.

Geography

It is located in the historical Gemer region and lies on the Slaná river.

Demographics
According to the 2001 census, the town had 8,169 inhabitants. 62.14% of inhabitants were Hungarians, 29.77% Slovaks, 6.70% Roma and 0.50% Czech. The religious make-up was 49.37% Roman Catholics, 17.03% people with no religious affiliation and 7.33% Lutherans.

Twin towns — sister cities

Tornaľa is twinned with:
 Heves, Hungary
 Putnok, Hungary
 Tarnów, Poland
 Valea lui Mihai, Romania

References

External links

 Official website 

Villages and municipalities in Revúca District
Cities and towns in Slovakia
Hungarian communities in Slovakia